Love and Marriage is an American situation comedy television series starring Anthony Denison and Patricia Healy as a New York working couple trying to raise a family. The series premiered September 28, 1996, on Fox as the first series created by Amy Sherman-Palladino (before her marriage to Daniel Palladino), who would later go on to create Gilmore Girls and Bunheads. The show was canceled after three episodes.

Synopsis
Jack, who manages a parking garage by day, and his wife April, who works nights waitressing in a Manhattan restaurant, barely have any time to spend together, or with their three children Michael, Gemmy and Christopher. Louis and Trudy, and son Max, are their new neighbors from New Rochelle, New York.

Cast
Anthony Denison as Jack Nardini
Patricia Healy as April Nardini
Adam Zolotin as 11-year-old Christopher Nardini
Alicia Bergman as 16-year-old Gemmy Nardini
Erik Palladino as 17-year-old Michael Nardini
Meagen Fay as Trudy Begg
Michael Mantell as Louis Begg
Adam Wylie as 11-year-old Max Begg

Episodes
Nine episodes are registered with the United States Copyright Office.

Reception
Howard Rosenberg of the Los Angeles Times called the series "another routine sitcom", which revolves around a "noisy family". Steven Linan, also of the Los Angeles Times, said the "uninspired sitcom could use further alterations in concept and scripts" since the show already had its title changed from Come Fly With Me. Tom Shales of The Washington Post was equally unimpressed and called the series "among the least amusing" of the new season. However, Tony Scott of Variety said "sharply written by creator Amy Sherman, directed expertly by Gail Mancuso, the Nardinis are people worth visiting". Scott further stated that the series "exudes joy, not cynicism, charm, not snideness".

References

External links
Official Website

1990s American sitcoms
1996 American television series debuts
1996 American television series endings
Fox Broadcasting Company original programming
Television series by Sony Pictures Television
Television shows set in New York City
Television series created by Amy Sherman-Palladino